ATEI is a four-letter acronym and can refer to:

 Amusement Trades Exhibition International, the major UK trade show for the coin-op and amusements trade.
 Technological Educational Institute (A.T.E.I., 2001~present) of tertiary education in Greece -